The 2018 European Aesthetic Group Gymnastics Championships, the 3rd edition, was held in Tallinn, Estonia, from May 11 to 13, 2018 at the Kalev Sports Hall.

Schedule

May 12 Saturday
 12:00 Opening Ceremony
 12:15 Junior Preliminaries
 18:00 Senior Preliminaries 

May 13 Sunday
 12:00 Junior Finals
 13:30 Senior Finals
 15:00 Awarding and Closing Ceremony

Medal winners

Results

Senior

The top 12 teams (2 per country) and the host country in Preliminaries qualify to the Finals.

Medal table

References

External links
https://ifagg.sporttisaitti.com/events/?x118457=264179
http://172.104.246.10/resultx.php?id_prop=585
http://www.eevl.ee/agg-ech-18

2018 in gymnastics
2018 in Estonian sport